The Estadio Guaycura is a football stadium in La Paz, Baja California Sur, Mexico. With a capacity of 5,209, it serves as the home stadium of Club Atlético La Paz in the second-tier Liga de Expansión MX.  Along with the baseball-specific Estadio Arturo C. Nahl and the indoor Arena La Paz, it forms a part of a sports complex called Villa Deportiva de La Paz.

History
In 2018, the stadium underwent a process of expansion and modernization in order to meet the necessary requirements to be able to host a professional football team. This work included the installation of five thousand new seats, artificial turf, LED lights, changing rooms, luxury boxes, additional restroom facilities and amenities for disabled individuals.

In February 2019, a friendly match between legends from Chivas and América was held at the stadium to inaugurate the renovations. It was also announced that the venue would be hosting Lobos Marinos de La Paz, who were set to make their debut in the third-tier Liga Premier de México in the upcoming 2019–20 season.

In April 2022, the stadium became the home ground for Club Atlético La Paz, a team that will play in the second category of Mexican football starting in the 2022–23 season.

Alternate uses
The stadium has also been used sparingly for events such as concerts and political gatherings, as well as amateur football matches.

References

La Paz, Baja California Sur
Sport in Baja California Sur
Football venues in Mexico
Sports venues completed in 1967
1967 establishments in Mexico